Atomic Frontier Days: Hanford and the American West is a nonfiction book describing the history of the Hanford Site. It details the history of Hanford and the neighboring Tri-Cities region during World War II and the Cold War. A review in the Journal of American History called it "a narrative of tangled, contending motives and complex consequences that does not end happily" and noted its writing "with the broad view of western-regional as well as local and national concerns" compared to other more locally-oriented works such as On the Home Front: The Cold War Legacy of the Hanford Nuclear Site, Made in Hanford: The Bomb That Changed the World and Working on the Bomb: An Oral History of WWII Hanford.

References

Sources

Further reading 
Reviews
 Project MUSE

 

2011 non-fiction books
Cold War military history of the United States
Hanford Site
Books about the Cold War
University of Washington Press books